A number of different Markov models of DNA sequence evolution have been proposed.  These substitution models differ in terms of the parameters used to describe the rates at which one nucleotide replaces another during evolution. These models are frequently used in molecular phylogenetic analyses. In particular, they are used during the calculation of likelihood of a tree (in Bayesian and maximum likelihood approaches to tree estimation) and they are used to estimate the evolutionary distance between sequences from the observed differences between the sequences.

Introduction

These models are phenomenological descriptions of the evolution of DNA as a string of four discrete states. These Markov models do not explicitly depict the mechanism of mutation nor the action of natural selection. Rather they describe the relative rates of different changes.  For example, mutational biases and purifying selection favoring conservative changes are probably both responsible for the relatively high rate of transitions compared to transversions in evolving sequences.  However, the Kimura (K80) model described below only attempts to capture the effect of both forces in a parameter that reflects the relative rate of transitions to transversions.

Evolutionary analyses of sequences are conducted on a wide variety of time scales. Thus, it is convenient to express these models in terms of the instantaneous rates of change between different states (the Q matrices below).  If we are given a starting (ancestral) state at one position, the model's Q matrix and a branch length expressing the expected number of changes to have occurred since the ancestor, then we can derive the probability of the descendant sequence having each of the four states.  The mathematical details of this transformation from rate-matrix to probability matrix are described in the mathematics of substitution models section of the substitution model page. By expressing models in terms of the instantaneous rates of change we can avoid estimating a large numbers of parameters for each branch on a phylogenetic tree (or each comparison if the analysis involves many pairwise sequence comparisons).

The models described on this page describe the evolution of a single site within a set of sequences. They are often used for analyzing the evolution of an entire locus by making the simplifying assumption that different sites evolve independently and are identically distributed. This assumption may be justifiable if the sites can be assumed to be evolving neutrally. If the primary effect of natural selection on the evolution of the sequences is to constrain some sites, then models of among-site rate-heterogeneity can be used. This approach allows one to estimate only one matrix of relative rates of substitution, and another set of parameters describing the variance in the total rate of substitution across sites.

DNA evolution as a continuous-time Markov chain

Continuous-time Markov chains
Continuous-time Markov chains have the usual transition matrices 
which are, in addition, parameterized by time, .  Specifically, if  are the states, then the transition matrix

  where each individual entry,  refers to the probability that state  will change to state  in time .

Example:  We would like to model the substitution process in DNA sequences (i.e. Jukes–Cantor, Kimura, etc.) in a continuous-time fashion.  The corresponding transition matrices will look like:

 

where the top-left and bottom-right 2 × 2 blocks correspond to transition probabilities  and the top-right and bottom-left 2 × 2 blocks corresponds to transversion probabilities.

Theorem: Continuous-time transition matrices satisfy:

Note: There is here a possible confusion between two meanings of the word transition. (i) In the context of Markov chains, transition is the general term for the change between two states. (ii) In the context of nucleotide changes in DNA sequences, transition is a specific term for the exchange between either the two purines (A ↔ G) or the two pyrimidines (C ↔ T) (for additional details, see the article about transitions in genetics). By contrast, an exchange between one purine and one pyrimidine is called a transversion.

Deriving the dynamics of substitution
Consider a DNA sequence of fixed length m evolving in time by base replacement.  Assume that the processes followed by the m sites are Markovian independent, identically distributed and that the process is constant over time.  For a particular site, let

be the set of possible states for the site, and

their respective probabilities at time . For two distinct , let  be the transition rate from state  to state . Similarly, for any , let the total rate of change from  be

The changes in the probability distribution  for small increments of time  are given by

In other words, (in frequentist language), the frequency of 's at time  is equal to the frequency at time  minus the frequency of the lost 's plus the frequency of the newly created 's.

These equations can be written compactly as

where

is known as the rate matrix. It follows that

For a stationary process, where  does not depend on time t, this differential equation can be solved. First,

where  denotes the exponential of the matrix . As a result,

Ergodicity

If the Markov chain is irreducible, i.e. if it is always possible to go from a state  to a state  (possibly in several steps), then it is also ergodic. As a result, it has a unique stationary distribution , where  corresponds to the proportion of time spent in state  after the Markov chain has run for an infinite amount of time. In DNA evolution, under the assumption of a common process for each site, the stationary frequencies  correspond to equilibrium base compositions. Indeed, note that since the stationary distribution  satisfies , we see that when the current distribution  is the stationary distribution  we have

In other words, the frequencies of  do not change.

Time reversibility 

This means that:

Not all stationary processes are reversible, however, most commonly used DNA evolution models assume time reversibility, which is considered to be a reasonable assumption.

Under the time reversibility assumption, let , then it is easy to see that:

In other words,  is the fraction of the frequency of state  that is the result of transitions from state  to state .

Corollary The 12 off-diagonal entries of the rate matrix,  (note the off-diagonal entries determine the diagonal entries, since the rows of  sum to zero) can be completely determined by 9 numbers; these are: 6 exchangeability terms and 3 stationary frequencies , (since the stationary frequencies sum to 1).

Scaling of branch lengths
By comparing extant sequences, one can determine the amount of sequence divergence. This raw measurement of divergence provides information about the number of changes that have occurred along the path separating the sequences. The simple count of differences (the Hamming distance) between sequences will often underestimate the number of substitution because of multiple hits (see homoplasy). Trying to estimate the exact number of changes that have occurred is difficult, and usually not necessary. Instead, branch lengths (and path lengths) in phylogenetic analyses are usually expressed in the expected number of changes per site. The path length is the product of the duration of the path in time and the mean rate of substitutions.  While their product can be estimated, the rate and time are not identifiable from sequence divergence.

The descriptions of rate matrices on this page accurately reflect the relative magnitude of different substitutions, but these rate matrices are not scaled such that a branch length of 1 yields one expected change.  This scaling can be accomplished by multiplying every element of the matrix by the same factor, or simply by scaling the branch lengths. If we use the β to denote the scaling factor, and ν to denote the branch length measured in the expected number of substitutions per site then βν is used in the transition probability formulae below in place of μt. Note that ν is a parameter to be estimated from data, and is referred to as the branch length, while β is simply a number that can be calculated from the rate matrix (it is not a separate free parameter).

The value of β can be found by forcing the expected rate of flux of states to 1. The diagonal entries of the rate-matrix (the Q matrix) represent -1 times the rate of leaving each state. For time-reversible models, we know the equilibrium state frequencies (these are simply the πi parameter value for state i). Thus we can find the expected rate of change by calculating the sum of flux out of each state weighted by the proportion of sites that are expected to be in that class. Setting β to be the reciprocal of this sum will guarantee that scaled process has an expected flux of 1:

For example, in the Jukes–Cantor, the scaling factor would be 4/(3μ) because the rate of leaving each state is 3μ/4.

Most common models of DNA evolution

JC69 model (Jukes and Cantor 1969) 
JC69, the Jukes and Cantor 1969 model, is the simplest substitution model. There are several assumptions. It assumes equal base frequencies  and equal mutation rates. The only parameter of this model is therefore , the overall substitution rate. As previously mentioned, this variable becomes a constant when we normalize the mean-rate to 1.

 

 

When branch length, is measured in the expected number of changes per site then:
 

It is worth noticing that  what stands for sum of any column (or row) of matrix  multiplied by time and thus means expected number of substitutions in time  (branch duration) for each particular site (per site) when the rate of substitution equals .

Given the proportion  of sites that differ between the two sequences the Jukes–Cantor estimate of the evolutionary distance (in terms of the expected number of changes) between two sequences is given by 

The  in this formula is frequently referred to as the -distance. It is a sufficient statistic for calculating the Jukes–Cantor distance correction, but is not sufficient for the calculation of the evolutionary distance under the more complex models that follow (also note that  used in subsequent formulae is not identical to the "-distance").

K80 model (Kimura 1980) 

In Kimura's original description of the model the α and β were used to denote the rates of these types of substitutions, but it is now more common to set the rate of transversions to 1 and use κ to denote the transition/transversion rate ratio (as is done below). The K80 model assumes that all of the bases are equally frequent.

The Kimura two-parameter distance is given by:

where p is the proportion of sites that show transitional differences and 
q is the proportion of sites that show transversional differences.

K81 model (Kimura 1981) 

K81, the Kimura 1981 model, often called Kimura's three parameter model (K3P model) or the Kimura three substitution type (K3ST) model, has distinct rates for transitions and two distinct types of transversions. The K81 model assumes that all equilibrium base frequencies are equal (i.e.).

The K81 model is used much less often than the K80 (K2P) model for distance estimation and it is seldom the best-fitting model in maximum likelihood phylogenetics. Despite these facts, the K81 model has continued to be studied in the context of mathematical phylogenetics. One important property is the ability to perform a Hadamard transform assuming the site patterns were generated on a tree with nucleotides evolving under the K81 model. 

When used in the context of phylogenetics the Hadamard transform provides an elegant and fully invertible means to calculate expected site pattern frequencies given a set of branch lengths (or vice versa). The Hadamard transform can also be combined with a wide variety of methods to accommodate among-sites rate heterogeneity, using continuous distributions rather than the discrete approximations typically used in maximum likelihood phylogenetics (although one must sacrifice the invertibility of the Hadamard transform to use certain among-sites rate heterogeneity distributions).

F81 model (Felsenstein 1981) 

F81, the Felsenstein's 1981 model, is an extension of the JC69 model in which base frequencies are allowed to vary from 0.25

Rate matrix:

 

When branch length, ν, is measured in the expected number of changes per site then:

HKY85 model (Hasegawa, Kishino and Yano 1985) 

HKY85, the Hasegawa, Kishino and Yano 1985 model, can be thought of as combining the extensions made in the Kimura80 and Felsenstein81 models. Namely, it distinguishes between the rate of  transitions and transversions (using the κ parameter), and it allows unequal base frequencies. [ Felsenstein described a similar (but not equivalent) model in 1984 using a different parameterization; that latter model is referred to as the F84 model. ]

Rate matrix  

If we express the branch length, ν in terms of the expected number of changes per site then:

and formula for the other combinations of states can be obtained by substituting in the appropriate base frequencies.

T92 model (Tamura 1992) 

T92, the Tamura 1992 model, is a mathematical method developed to estimate the number of nucleotide substitutions per site between two DNA sequences, by extending Kimura's (1980) two-parameter method to the case where a G+C content bias exists. This method will be useful when there are strong transition-transversion and G+C-content biases, as in the case of Drosophila mitochondrial DNA.

T92 involves a single, compound base frequency parameter  (also noted ) 

As T92 echoes the Chargaff's second parity rule — pairing nucleotides do have the same frequency on a single DNA strand, G and C on the one hand, and A and T on the other hand — it follows that the four base frequences can be expressed as a function of 

  and  

Rate matrix  

The evolutionary distance between two DNA sequences according to this model is given by

TN93 model (Tamura and Nei 1993) 

Transversions are all assumed to occur at the same rate, but that rate is allowed to be different from both of the rates for transitions.

TN93 also allows unequal base frequencies.

Rate matrix

GTR model (Tavaré 1986) 

GTR, the Generalised time-reversible model of Tavaré 1986, is the most general neutral, independent, finite-sites, time-reversible model possible. It was first described in a general form by Simon Tavaré in 1986.

GTR parameters consist of an equilibrium base frequency vector, giving the frequency at which each base occurs at each site, and the rate matrix

 

Where

are the transition rate parameters.

Therefore, GTR (for four characters, as is often the case in phylogenetics) requires 6 substitution rate parameters, as well as 4 equilibrium base frequency parameters. However, this is usually eliminated down to 9 parameters plus , the overall number of substitutions per unit time. When measuring time in substitutions (=1) only 8 free parameters remain.

In general, to compute the number of parameters, one must count the number of entries above the diagonal in the matrix, i.e. for n trait values per site , and then add n for the equilibrium base frequencies, and subtract 1 because  is fixed. One gets

 

For example, for an amino acid sequence (there are 20 "standard" amino acids that make up proteins), one would find there are 209 parameters. However, when studying coding regions of the genome, it is more common to work with a codon substitution model (a codon is three bases and codes for one amino acid in a protein). There are  codons, but the rates for transitions between codons which differ by more than one base is assumed to be zero. Hence, there are  parameters.

See also 
Molecular evolution
Molecular clock
UPGMA

References

Further reading

External links 
DAWG: DNA Assembly With Gaps — free software for simulating sequence evolution

Bioinformatics
Phylogenetics
Computational phylogenetics
Markov models